Jawaharlal Nehru College, Boko, established in 1964, is a general degree college in Boko, Assam, India It is affiliated with Gauhati University.

Departments

Arts
 Anthropology
 Assamese
 English
 Education
 History
 Economics
 Political Science
 Bodo
 Geography

Science
 Physics
 Chemistry
 Zoology
 Botany
 Mathematics

References

External links
 

Universities and colleges in Assam
Colleges affiliated to Gauhati University
Educational institutions established in 1986
1986 establishments in Assam